Narend Singh (born 5 September 1954) is a South African politician who is the chief whip of the Inkatha Freedom Party in the National Assembly and the treasurer-general of the party. Prior to joining the National Assembly in 2007, he was a Member of the Executive Council in the KwaZulu-Natal provincial government from 1997 until 2006 and a member of the Senate from 1994 to 1996.

Early life and education
Singh was born on 5 September 1954 in Umkomaas, Natal Province. He attended Umkomaas Drift Primary and Naidoo Memorial School. In 1971, he started studying towards a Bachelor of Commerce degree from the University of Durban-Westville. He left the university in 1974 to help out at a family business. Singh later completed a postgraduate diploma in Economic Principles from the University of London in 1997. In 2003, he obtained a master's degree in public policy and administration from the university.

In 2019, he received a postgraduate diploma in public policy and African studies from the University of Johannesburg.

Political career
In 1988, Singh was recruited by community members to contest the 1989 House of Delegates election in the Umzinto constituency. He went on to contest the election as a member of the Solidarity Party and won easily. Singh received 5,024 votes. In 1993, he joined the Inkatha Freedom Party. He turned down an offer from Roger Burrows to join the Democratic Party.

Following the first multi-racial elections in 1994, Singh was elected to the Senate as an IFP delegate from KwaZulu-Natal. He served in the Senate until 1996, when the IFP redeployed him to the KwaZulu-Natal Legislature. In April 1997, he was appointed to the province's Executive Council and served on the council until March 2006, when he resigned following a sex scandal. Although the scandal was an embarrassment to the party, the party decided not to expel him.

In August 2007, he was appointed to the National Assembly of South Africa to replace Nhlanhla Zulu, who had died the previous month. Singh has since been re-elected in April 2009, May 2014 and May 2019.

Singh was later appointed as the IFP's chief whip in the assembly. He is also the party's treasurer-general.

Personal life
Singh is married to Manitha, and they have two children together.

References

External links
Narend Singh at Inkatha Freedom Party

Living people
1954 births
South African politicians of Indian descent
People from KwaZulu-Natal
Members of the National Assembly of South Africa
Members of the KwaZulu-Natal Legislature
20th-century South African politicians
21st-century South African politicians
Inkatha Freedom Party politicians